Richard Buchanan (3 May 1912 – 22 January 2003) was a British Labour politician.

Buchanan was educated at St. Mungo's Academy. He worked as an engineer and toolfitter and was a councillor on the Glasgow Corporation from 1949. He joined the National Union of Railwaymen in 1928, and in later years was secretary of its political committee, in addition to being president of the Scottish Library Association.

Buchanan served on Glasgow City Council from 1949.  He was the member of parliament for Glasgow Springburn from 1964 to 1979, preceding Michael Martin.

References

Times Guide to the House of Commons October 1974

External links 
 

1912 births
2003 deaths
Scottish Labour MPs
Members of the Parliament of the United Kingdom for Glasgow constituencies
National Union of Railwaymen-sponsored MPs
Scottish Labour councillors
UK MPs 1964–1966
UK MPs 1966–1970
UK MPs 1970–1974
UK MPs 1974
UK MPs 1974–1979
People educated at St Mungo's Academy
Springburn